North Korea has a military nuclear weapons program and, as of early 2020, is estimated to have an arsenal of approximately 30 to 40 nuclear weapons and sufficient production of fissile material for six to seven nuclear weapons per year. North Korea has also stockpiled a significant quantity of chemical and biological weapons. In 2003, North Korea withdrew from the Treaty on the Non-Proliferation of Nuclear Weapons (NPT). Since 2006, the country has been conducting a series of six nuclear tests at increasing levels of expertise, prompting the imposition of sanctions.

History 

North Korea showed an interest in developing nuclear weapons since the 1950s. The nuclear program can be traced back to about 1962, when North Korea committed itself to what it called "all-fortressization", which was the beginning of the hyper-militarized North Korea of today. In 1963, North Korea asked the Soviet Union for help in developing nuclear weapons, but was refused. The Soviet Union agreed to help North Korea develop a peaceful nuclear energy program, including the training of nuclear scientists. Later, China, after its nuclear tests, similarly rejected North Korean requests for help with developing nuclear weapons.

Soviet engineers took part in the construction of the Yongbyon Nuclear Scientific Research Center and began construction of an IRT-2000 research reactor in 1963, which became operational in 1965 and was upgraded to 8 MW in 1974. In 1979, North Korea began to build a second research reactor in Yongbyon, as well as an ore processing plant and a fuel rod fabrication plant.

North Korea's nuclear weapons program dates back to the 1980s. Focusing on practical uses of nuclear energy and the completion of a nuclear weapon development system, North Korea began to operate facilities for uranium fabrication and conversion, and conducted high-explosive detonation tests. In 1985 North Korea ratified the NPT but did not include the required safeguards agreement with the IAEA until 1992. In early 1993, while verifying North Korea's initial declaration, the IAEA concluded that there was strong evidence this declaration was incomplete. When North Korea refused the requested special inspection, the IAEA reported its noncompliance to the UN Security Council. In 1993, North Korea announced its withdrawal from the NPT, but suspended that withdrawal before it took effect.

Under the 1994 Agreed Framework, the U.S. government agreed to facilitate the supply of two light water reactors to North Korea in exchange for North Korean disarmament. Such reactors are considered "more proliferation-resistant than North Korea's graphite-moderated reactors", but not "proliferation proof". The Agreed Framework was undermined by a Republican Congress during Clinton's presidency, as Congress denounced the agreement with North Korea, imposed new sanctions on North Korea, and hindered the Clinton administration from providing the supplies to North Korea that were part of the Agreed Framework. Implementation of the Agreed Framework foundered, and in 2002 the Agreed Framework fell apart, with each side blaming the other for its failure. By 2002, Pakistan had admitted that North Korea had gained access to Pakistan's nuclear technology in the late 1990s.

Based on evidence from Pakistan, Libya, and multiple confessions from North Korea itself, the United States accused North Korea of noncompliance and halted oil shipments; North Korea later claimed its public confession of guilt had been deliberately misconstrued. By the end of 2002, the Agreed Framework was officially abandoned.

In 2003, North Korea again announced its withdrawal from the Nuclear Non-Proliferation Treaty. In 2005, it admitted to having nuclear weapons but vowed to close the nuclear program.

On October 9, 2006, North Korea announced it had successfully conducted its first nuclear test. An underground nuclear explosion was detected, its yield was estimated as less than a kiloton, and some radioactive output was detected. On January 6, 2007, the North Korean government further confirmed that it had nuclear weapons.

On March 17, 2007, North Korea told delegates at international nuclear talks that it was preparing to shut down its main nuclear facility. The agreement was reached following a series of six-party talks, involving North Korea, South Korea, China, Russia, Japan, and the United States begun in 2003. According to the agreement, a list of its nuclear programs would be submitted and the nuclear facility would be disabled in exchange for fuel aid and normalization talks with the United States and Japan. This was delayed from April due to a dispute with the United States over Banco Delta Asia, but on July 14, International Atomic Energy Agency inspectors confirmed the shutdown of North Korea's Yongbyon nuclear reactor and consequently North Korea began to receive aid. This agreement fell apart in 2009, following a North Korean satellite launch.

In April 2009, reports surfaced that North Korea has become a "fully fledged nuclear power", an opinion shared by International Atomic Energy Agency (IAEA) Director General Mohamed ElBaradei. On May 25, 2009, North Korea conducted a second nuclear test, resulting in an explosion estimated to be between 2 and 7 kilotons. The 2009 test, like the 2006 test, is believed to have occurred at Mantapsan, Kilju County, in the north-eastern part of North Korea. This was found by an earthquake occurring at the test site.

In February 2012, North Korea announced that it would suspend uranium enrichment at the Yongbyon Nuclear Scientific Research Center and not conduct any further tests of nuclear weapons while productive negotiations involving the United States continue. This agreement included a moratorium on long-range missile tests. Additionally, North Korea agreed to allow IAEA inspectors to monitor operations at Yongbyon. The United States reaffirmed that it had no hostile intent toward the DPRK and was prepared to improve bilateral relationships, and agreed to ship humanitarian food aid to North Korea. The United States called the move "important, if limited", but said it would proceed cautiously and that talks would resume only after North Korea made steps toward fulfilling its promise. However, after North Korea conducted a long-range missile test in April 2012, the United States decided not to proceed with the food aid.

On February 11, 2013, the U.S. Geological Survey detected a magnitude 5.1 seismic disturbance, reported to be a third underground nuclear test. North Korea has officially reported it as a successful nuclear test with a lighter warhead that delivers more force than before, but has not revealed the exact yield. Multiple South Korean sources estimate the yield at 6–9 kilotons, while the German Federal Institute for Geosciences and Natural Resources estimates the yield at 40 kilotons. However, the German estimate has since been revised to a yield equivalent of 14 kt when they published their estimations in January 2016.

On January 6, 2016, in Korea, the United States Geological Survey detected a magnitude 5.1 seismic disturbance, reported to be a fourth underground nuclear test. North Korea claimed that this test involved a hydrogen bomb. This claim has not been verified. A "hydrogen bomb" could refer to several stages of fusion development, ranging from boosted fission devices to true thermonuclear weapons.

Within hours, many nations and organizations had condemned the test. Expert U.S. analysts do not believe that a hydrogen bomb was detonated. Seismic data collected so far suggests a 6–9 kiloton yield and that magnitude is not consistent with the power that would be generated by a hydrogen bomb explosion. "What we're speculating is they tried to do a boosted nuclear device, which is an atomic bomb that has a little bit of hydrogen, an isotope in it called tritium," said Joseph Cirincione, president of the global security firm Ploughshares Fund. The German source which estimates for all the North Korea's past nuclear test has instead made an initial estimation of 14 kt, which is about the same (revised) yield as its previous nuclear test in 2013. However, the yield estimation for January 2016 nuclear test was revised to 10 kt in the subsequent nuclear test from North Korea.

On February 7, 2016, roughly a month after the alleged hydrogen bomb test, North Korea claimed to have put a satellite into orbit around the Earth. Japanese Prime Minister Shinzō Abe had warned the North to not launch the rocket, and if it did and the rocket violated Japanese territory, it would be shot down. Nevertheless, North Korea launched the rocket anyway, leading the United States, Japan, and South Korea to criticize the launch. Despite North Korean claims that the rocket was for peaceful, scientific purposes, it has been heavily criticized as an attempt to perform an ICBM test under the guise of a satellite launch. China also criticized the launch, however urged "the relevant parties" to "refrain from taking actions that may further escalate tensions on the Korean peninsula".

A fifth nuclear test occurred on September 9, 2016. This test yield is considered the highest among all five tests thus far, surpassing its previous record in 2013. The South Korean government said that the yield was about 10 kt despite other sources suggesting a  yield. The same German source which has made estimation of all North Korea's previous nuclear tests suggested an estimation of a 25 kiloton yield.

Other nations and the United Nations have responded to North Korea's ongoing missile and nuclear development with a variety of sanctions; on March 2, 2016, the UN Security Council voted to impose additional sanctions against North Korea.

In 2017, North Korea test-launched two ICBMs, the second of which had sufficient range to reach the continental United States. In September 2017, the country announced a further "perfect" hydrogen bomb test.

Until 2022, North Korea's stated policy position was that nuclear weapons "will never be abused or used as a means for preemptive strike", but if there is an "attempt to have recourse to military force against us" North Korea may use their "most powerful offensive strength in advance to punish them". This was not a full no first use policy. This policy changed in 2022 with a law approved by the Supreme People's Assembly, which states that in the case of an attack against the top leadership or the nuclear command and control system, nuclear attacks against the enemy would be launched automatically. Additionally, the new law indicates that if Kim Jong-un was killed, the authorization of nuclear strikes would pass to a senior official.

Nuclear weapons

Overview 

The Korean Central News Agency claims that the "U.S. has long posed nuclear threats to the DPRK" and "the U.S. was seized by a foolish ambition to bring down the DPRK", so it "needed a countermeasure". North Korea has been suspected of maintaining a clandestine nuclear weapons development program since the early 1980s, when it constructed a plutonium-producing Magnox nuclear reactor at Yongbyon. Various diplomatic means have been used by the international community to attempt to limit North Korea's nuclear program to peaceful power generation and to encourage North Korea to participate in international treaties.
 
In May 1992, the International Atomic Energy Agency's (IAEA) first inspection in North Korea uncovered discrepancies suggesting that the country had reprocessed more plutonium than declared. IAEA requested access to additional information and access to two nuclear waste sites at Yongbyon. North Korea rejected the IAEA request and announced on March 12, 1993, an intention to withdraw from the NPT.

In 1994, North Korea pledged, under the Agreed Framework with the United States, to freeze its plutonium programs and dismantle all its nuclear weapons programs in return for the normalization of diplomatic relations and several kinds of assistance, including resources for alternative energy supplies.

By 2002, the United States believed North Korea was pursuing both uranium enrichment technology and plutonium reprocessing technologies in defiance of the Agreed Framework. North Korea reportedly told American diplomats in private that they were in possession of nuclear weapons, citing American failures to uphold their own end of the Agreed Framework as a motivating force. North Korea later "clarified" that it did not possess weapons yet, but that it had "a right" to possess them, despite the Agreed Framework. In late 2002 and early 2003, North Korea began to take steps to eject International Atomic Energy Agency inspectors while re-routing spent fuel rods to be used for plutonium reprocessing for weapons purposes. As late as the end of 2003, North Korea claimed that it would freeze its nuclear program in exchange for additional American concessions, but a final agreement was not reached. North Korea withdrew from the Nuclear Non-Proliferation Treaty in 2003.

2006 

On October 9, 2006, North Korea demonstrated its nuclear capabilities with its first underground nuclear test, detonating a plutonium-based device with an estimated yield of 0.2–1 kilotons. The test was conducted at Punggye-ri Nuclear Test Site in North Hamgyong Province, and U.S. intelligence officials later announced that analysis of radioactive debris in air samples collected a few days after the test confirmed that the blast had taken place. The UN Security Council condemned the test and announced the imposition of Resolution 1718.

Aftermath of 2006 nuclear test 
On January 6, 2007, the North Korean government further confirmed that it had nuclear weapons.

In February 2007, following the six-party talks disarmament process, Pyongyang agreed to shut down its main nuclear reactor. On October 8, 2008, IAEA inspectors were forbidden by the North Korean government to conduct further inspections of the site.

2009 

On April 25, 2009, the North Korean government announced the country's nuclear facilities had been reactivated, and that spent fuel reprocessing for arms-grade plutonium has been restored.

On May 25, 2009, North Korea conducted its second underground nuclear test. The U.S. Geological Survey calculated its origin in proximity of the site of the first nuclear test. The test was more powerful than the previous test, estimated at 2 to 7 kilotons. The same day, a successful short-range missile test was also conducted.

2010 
In May 2010, the North Korean government claimed to have successfully performed nuclear fusion. Although the claim was largely dismissed at the time, a 2012 analysis of radioisotopes suggested that North Korea may have performed two nuclear tests involving fusion. The paper was met with skepticism, as subsequent analysis of seismic data suggested no tests took place. In 2014, a study using seismic data found evidence for nuclear testing but a 2016 study once again dismissed claims of nuclear testing, suggesting that the seismic data was indicative of a minor earthquake.

2013 

On February 12, monitors in Asia picked up unusual seismic activity at a North Korean facility at 11:57 (02:57 GMT), later determined to be an artificial quake with an initial magnitude 4.9 (later revised to 5.1).  In The Korean Central News Agency subsequently said that the country had detonated a miniaturized nuclear device with "greater explosive force" in an underground test. According to the Korea Institute of Geosciences and Mineral Resources, the estimated yield was 7.7–7.8 kilotons. Other researchers estimate the yield to have been 12.2 ± 3.8 kilotons.

December 2015 hydrogen bomb claim 
In December 2015, Kim Jong-un suggested that the country had the capacity to launch a hydrogen bomb, a device of considerably more power than conventional atomic bombs used in previous tests. The remark was met with skepticism from the White House and from South Korean officials.

2016

First claimed North Korean hydrogen bomb test 

On January 7, after reports of a magnitude 5.1 earthquake originating in northeast North Korea at 10:00:01 UTC+08:30, the country's regime released statements that it had successfully tested a hydrogen bomb. Whether this was in fact a hydrogen bomb has yet to be proven. Experts have cast doubt on this claim. A South Korean spy expert suggested that it may have been an atomic bomb and not a hydrogen bomb. Experts in several countries, including South Korea have expressed doubts about the claimed technology because of the relatively small size of the explosion. Senior Defense Analyst Bruce W. Bennett of research organization RAND told the BBC that "Kim Jong-un is either lying, saying they did a hydrogen test when they didn't, they just used a little bit more efficient fission weapon – or the hydrogen part of the test really didn't work very well or the fission part didn't work very well."

Aftermath of claimed North Korean hydrogen bomb test 

On March 9, 2016, North Korea released a video of Kim Jong Un visiting a missile factory. The international community was skeptical, IHS Jane's Karl Dewey said that "It is possible that the silver sphere is a simple atomic bomb. But it is not a hydrogen bomb." Furthermore, he said "a hydrogen bomb would not only be in two parts but also be a different shape".

Nations across the world, as well as NATO and the UN, spoke out against the tests as destabilizing, as a danger to international security and as a breach of UN Security Council resolutions. China, one of North Korea's allies, also denounced the test.

First nuclear warhead test explosion 

On September 9, 2016, a 5.3 seismic tremor was detected by seismographs in surrounding countries, after which North Korea confirmed it conducted another nuclear test. North Korea stated that this test has enabled them to confirm that its warhead can be mounted to a missile and to verify the warhead's power. It was previously doubted that North Korea could pair the nuclear warhead and missile together, but South Korean experts started to believe that North Korea can accomplish this goal within a few years after the September 9 nuclear test.

2017 

On February 18, 2017, China announced that it was suspending all imports of coal from North Korea as part of its effort to enact United Nations Security Council sanctions aimed at stopping the country's nuclear weapons and ballistic-missile program.
On March 6, 2017, North Korea launched four ballistic missiles from the Tongchang-ri region towards the Sea of Japan. The launch was condemned by the United Nations as well as South Korea. The move prompted US Secretary of State Rex Tillerson to embark on a diplomatic mission ten days later to Japan, South Korea and China, in an effort to address the heightened international tension in the region. On April 13, 2017, White House representative Nick Rivero was quoted saying the United States was "very close" to engaging in some sort of retaliation towards North Korea. President Trump commented on North Korea by saying they will fight the war on terrorism no matter the cost.

On April 15, 2017, at the yearly major public holiday also known in the country as the Day of the Sun, North Korea staged a massive military parade to commemorate the 105th birth anniversary of Kim Il-sung, the country's founder and grandfather of current leader, Kim Jong-un. The parade took place amid hot speculation in the United States, Japan, and South Korea that the country would also potentially test a sixth nuclear device, but failed to do so. The parade did publicly display, for the first time, two new intercontinental ballistic missile-sized canisters as well as submarine-launched ballistic missiles and a land-based version of the same.

On April 16, 2017, hours after the military parade in Pyongyang, North Korea attempted to launch a ballistic missile from a site near the port of Sinpo, on the country's east coast. The missile exploded seconds after launch.

Later that month, after a visit to Washington by the top Chinese leader, the US State Department announced that North Korea was likely to face economic sanctions from China if it conducted any further tests.

On April 28, 2017, North Korea launched an unidentified ballistic missile over Pukchang airfield, in North Korean territory. It blew up shortly after take-off at an altitude of approximately 70 km (44 mi).

On July 4, 2017, North Korea launched Hwasong-14 from Banghyon airfield, near Kusong, in a lofted trajectory it claims lasted 39 minutes for 930 km (578 mi), landing in the waters of the Japanese exclusive economic zone. US Pacific Command said the missile was aloft for 37 minutes, meaning that in a standard trajectory it could have reached all of Alaska, a distance of 6,690 km (4,160 mi).
By targeting the deep waters in the Sea of Japan, North Korea was ensuring that American or Japanese divers would encounter difficulties when attempting to recover Hwasong-14's engine. Equally, North Korea was not attempting to recover any re-entry debris either, which South Korea pointed out is an indication that this first launch was of an ICBM which was far from ready for combat. As of July 2017, the U.S. estimated that North Korea would have a reliable nuclear-capable intercontinental ballistic missile (ICBM) by early 2018. On July 28, North Korea launched a second, apparently more advanced, ICBM, with altitude around 3,700 km (2,300 mi), that traveled 1,000 km (620 mi) down range; analysts estimated that it was capable of reaching the continental United States.

Aerospace engineer and weapons analyst Dr. John Schilling estimates the current accuracy of the North's Hwasong-14 as poor, at the mooted ranges which threaten US cities. Michael Elleman points out that July 28, 2017 missile re-entry vehicle broke up on re-entry; further testing would be required.
On August 8, 2017 The Washington Post reported that the Defense Intelligence Agency, in a confidential assessment, stated that North Korea has sufficiently miniaturized a nuclear warhead to fit inside one of its long-range missiles. On August 12 The Diplomat reported that the Central Intelligence Agency, in a confidential assessment from early August, has concluded that the reentry vehicle in the July 28 test of Hwasong-14 did not survive atmospheric reentry due to apogee of 3,700 kilometers which caused structural stresses in excess of what an ICBM would have had in minimum energy trajectory. The CIA also concluded that North Korean reentry vehicle is likely advanced enough that it would likely survive reentry under normal minimum energy trajectory.

On September 3, 2017, North Korea claimed to have successfully tested a thermonuclear bomb, also known as a hydrogen bomb. Corresponding seismic activity similar to an earthquake of magnitude 6.3 was reported by the USGS, making the blast around 10 times more powerful than previous detonations by the country. Later the bomb yield was estimated to be 250 kilotons, based on further study of the seismic data. The test was reported to be "a perfect success" by North Korean authorities.

On November 20, 2017, U.S. President Donald Trump announced that North Korea was re-listed by the State Department as a state sponsor of terrorism. Japan and South Korea welcomed the move as a method of increasing pressure on North Korea to negotiate about denuclearization.

On November 28, 2017, North Korea fired an intercontinental ballistic missile in the first such launch from the country in more than two months. The missile, believed by the U.S. military to be an ICBM, was launched from Sain Ni and flew roughly 1,000 km (620 mi) before landing in the Sea of Japan.

After North Korea claimed that the missile was capable of "carrying [a] super-heavy [nuclear] warhead and hitting the whole mainland of the U.S.", Kim-Jong-Un announced that they had "finally realized the great historic cause of completing the state nuclear force", putting them in a position of strength to push the United States into talks.

2019 

In August 2019 Japan has upgraded its estimate of North Korea's nuclear weapons capability in an upcoming annual Defence White Paper, saying it seems Pyongyang has achieved the miniaturization of warheads. The defence report will maintain Japan's contention that North Korea's nuclear and ballistic missile programs pose a "serious and imminent threat" to its security after recent meetings between Donald Trump and the North's leader, Kim Jong-un, failed to make progress on denuclearisation.

2020 
Bruce Klingner of the U.S.-based Heritage Foundation estimated, in June 2020, that North Korea has likely built "eight or more additional nuclear weapons" since the 2018 summit.

On October 10, 2020, North Korea unveiled a massive ICBM during a military parade for the 75th anniversary of the Workers' Party of Korea, with CNN reporting that military analysts believe it is one of the world's largest road-mobile ballistic missiles.

2022 
In the first 4 weeks of 2022, North Korea conducted 7 missile tests. Missiles tested included a hypersonic glide vehicle, an intermediate range ballistic missile (IRBM) and various cruise missiles.

On September 9, 2022, North Korea passed a law to declare itself a nuclear weapons state and rejected any possibility of denuclearisation.

Fissile material production

Plutonium facilities 

North Korea's plutonium-based nuclear reactors are located at the Yongbyon Nuclear Scientific Research Center, about 90 km north of Pyongyang.
 One Soviet-supplied IRT-2000 research reactor, completed in 1967. Uranium irradiated in this reactor was used in North Korea's first plutonium separation experiments in 1975. Nevertheless, the primary purpose of the reactor is not to produce plutonium and North Korea has had trouble acquiring enough fuel for constant operation. The U.S. Department of Energy estimated that this reactor could have been used to produce up to 1–2 kg of plutonium, though the Joint Atomic Energy Intelligence Committee said that the amount was no more than a few hundred grams.
 A newer nuclear reactor with a capacity of 5 MWe. This gas-graphite moderated Magnox type reactor is North Korea's main reactor, where practically all of its plutonium has been produced. A full core consists of 8,000 fuel rods and can yield a maximum of 27–29 kg of plutonium if left in the reactor for optimal burnup. The North Korean Plutonium Stock, Mid-2006, is estimated to be able to produce 0.9 grams of plutonium per thermal megawatt every day of its operation. The material required to make a single bomb is approximately four to eight kilograms. Often, North Korea has unloaded the reactor before reaching the maximum burnup level. There are three known cores which were unloaded in 1994 (under IAEA supervision in accordance with the Agreed Framework), 2005, and 2007.

In 1989, the 5 MWe reactor was shut down for a period of seventy to a hundred days. In this time it is estimated that up to fifteen kilograms of plutonium could have been extracted. In 1994, North Korea unloaded its reactors again. The IAEA had these under full surveillance until later being denied the ability to observe North Korean power plants. Under normal operation, the reactor can produce about 6 kg of plutonium per year although the reactor would need to be shut down and the fuel rods extracted to begin the plutonium separation process. Hence, plutonium separation stages alternate with plutonium production stages. Reprocessing (also known as separation) is known to have taken place in 2003 for the first core and 2005 for the second core.
 Two Magnox reactors (50 MWe and 200 MWe), under construction at Yongbyon and Taechon. If completed, 50 MWe reactor would be capable of producing 60 kg of plutonium per year, enough for approximately 10 weapons and 200 MWe reactor 220 kg of plutonium annually, enough for approximately 40 weapons. Construction was halted in 1994 about a year from completion in accord with the Agreed Framework, and by 2004 the structures and pipework had deteriorated badly.
 Fuel reprocessing facility that recovers uranium and plutonium from spent fuel using the PUREX process. Based on extended Eurochemic reprocessing plant design at the Mol-Dessel site in Belgium. In 1994 its activity was frozen in accord with the Agreed Framework. On April 25, 2009, North Korean news agency KCNA, reported the resumption of reprocessing of spent fuel to recover plutonium.

On March 12, 1993, North Korea said that it planned to withdraw from the Nuclear Non-Proliferation Treaty (NPT) and refused to allow IAEA inspectors access to its nuclear sites. By 1994, the United States believed that North Korea had enough reprocessed plutonium to produce about 10 bombs with the amount of plutonium increasing. Faced with diplomatic pressure after UN Security Council Resolution 825 and the threat of American military air strikes against the reactor, North Korea agreed to dismantle its plutonium program as part of the Agreed Framework in which South Korea and the United States would provide North Korea with light water reactors and fuel oil until those reactors could be completed.

Because the light water reactors would require enriched uranium to be imported from outside North Korea, the amount of reactor fuel and waste could be more easily tracked, making it more difficult to divert nuclear waste to be reprocessed into plutonium. However, the Agreed Framework was mired in difficulties, with each side blaming the other for the delays in implementation; as a result, the light water reactors were never finished. In late 2002, after fuel aid was suspended, North Korea returned to using its old reactors.

In 2006, there were eight sites identified as potential test explosion sites for current (and future) tests according to a statement by the South Korean Parliament. These sites are distinguished from a number of other nuclear materials production facilities in that they are thought to be most closely identified with a military, or potentially military purpose:

1. Hamgyong Bukdo (North Hamgyong) Province – two sites:
 Chungjinsi – Nuclear fuel storage site, military base and unidentified underground facility
 Kiljugun – Extensive military buildup with motorized troop formations and construction of new advanced underground facility – Site of May 25, 2009, Nuclear Test.
 Phunggyere – Site of October 9, 2006, Nuclear Test

2. Chagangdo Province – one site: Kanggyesi – Production center of North Korea's advanced equipment and munitions since 1956. Also, extensive intelligence of highly advanced underground facility.

3. Pyongan Bukdo (North Pyongan) Province – four sites:
 Yongbyonsi – 2 Sites – Location of Yongbyon Nuclear Research Center, and the facility's Experimental Test Explosion facility and two unidentified underground facilities. In addition, there is a gas-graphite reactor, HE test site, nuclear fuel fabrication site, nuclear waste storage site
 Kusungsi – Between 1997 and September 2002, approximately 70 test explosions of North Korean munitions took place. Also, existence of underground facility
 Taechongun – 200MWe Nuclear Energy Plant construction site. Location of unidentified underground facility and nuclear arms/energy related facilities known to exist

4. Pyongan Namdo (South Pyongan) Province – one site: Pyongsungsi – Location of National Science Academy and extensive underground facility whose purpose is not known.

Highly enriched uranium program 
North Korea possesses uranium mines containing an estimated 4 million tons of high-grade uranium ore.

Prime minister Benazir Bhutto of Pakistan allegedly, through Pakistan's former top scientist, Abdul Qadeer Khan, supplied key data, stored on CDs, on uranium enrichment and information to North Korea in exchange for missile technology around 1990–1996, according to U.S. intelligence officials. President Pervez Musharraf and Prime minister Shaukat Aziz acknowledged in 2005 that Khan had provided centrifuges and their designs to North Korea. In May 2008, Khan, who had previously confessed to supplying the data on his own initiative, retracted his confession, claiming that the Pakistan Government forced him to be a "scapegoat". He also claimed that North Korea's nuclear program was well advanced before his visits to North Korea.

Highly enriched uranium (HEU) program was publicized in October 2002 when the United States asked North Korean officials about the program. Under the Agreed Framework, North Korea explicitly agreed to freeze plutonium programs (specifically, its "graphite moderated reactors and related facilities"). The agreement also committed North Korea to implement the Joint Declaration on the Denuclearization of the Korean Peninsula, in which both Koreas committed not to have enrichment or reprocessing facilities. The United States argued North Korea violated its commitment not to have enrichment facilities.

In December 2002, claiming North Korean non-compliance, the United States persuaded the KEDO Board to suspend fuel oil shipments, which led to the end of the Agreed Framework. North Korea responded by announcing plans to reactivate a dormant nuclear fuel processing program and power plant north of Pyongyang. North Korea soon thereafter expelled United Nations inspectors and announced a unilateral "withdrawal" from the Non-Proliferation Treaty.

In 2007, a Bush administration official assessed that, while there was still a "high confidence" that North Korea acquired materials that could be used in a "production-scale" uranium program, there is only a "mid-confidence" level such a production-scale uranium (rather than merely plutonium) program exists.

Construction of the probable first uranium enrichment facility started in 2002 at a site known as Kangson/Chollima by US intelligence, and could have been completed and developing or operating initial gas centrifuge cascades in 2003. The facility was suspected by US intelligence for many years. The Pyongsan Uranium Mine and Concentration Plant in Pyongsan is reported to be where uranium ore is turned into yellowcake.

CNN reported on September 15, 2021, that North Korea is expanding uranium enrichment facility at Yongbyon with 1000 square meter expansion for additional 1000 centrifuges that would increase output of highly enriched uranium by up to 25% yearly and if centrifuges were to be replaced with upgraded centrifuges, increase in HEU production would be substantial according to Jeffrey Lewis, weapons expert and professor at Middlebury Institute of International Studies.

Stockpile estimates and projections

RECNA 
In June 2020, the Research Center for Nuclear Weapons Abolition at Nagasaki University estimated that North Korea had as many as 35 nuclear weapons in its arsenal.

Bulletin of the Atomic Scientists 
As of January 8, 2018, Hans M. Kristensen and Robert S. Norris of the Federation of American Scientists published in the Bulletin of the Atomic Scientists that they "cautiously estimate that North Korea may have produced enough fissile material to build between 30 and 60 nuclear weapons and that it might possibly have assembled 10 to 20."

Defense Intelligence Agency
On August 8, 2017, the Washington Post reported recent analysis completed the previous month by the U.S. Defense Intelligence Agency which concluded that North Korea had successfully produced a miniaturized nuclear warhead that can fit in missiles and could have up to 60 nuclear warheads in its inventory.

By 2019 the DIA estimated that North Korea had accrued a stockpile of 65 weapons' worth of fissile material and that the country was producing as much as twelve weapons' worth of fissile material annually. U.S. intelligence also assessed that North Korea had built around 30 fissile material cores for use in nuclear weapons, including four-to-six two-stage thermonuclear weapons.

Siegfried S. Hecker
On August 7, 2017, Siegfried S. Hecker, former director of the Los Alamos National Laboratory who has visited North Korea nuclear facilities many times on behalf of the U.S., estimated that North Korea's stockpile of plutonium and highly enriched uranium was probably sufficient for 20 to 25 nuclear weapons. He assessed that North Korea had developed a miniaturized warhead suitable for medium-range missiles, but would need further tests and development to produce a smaller and more robust warhead suitable for an intercontinental ballistic missile (ICBM) and re-entry into the atmosphere. He considered the warhead as the least developed part of North Korea's plans for an ICBM.

In February 2019, Hecker estimated that North Korea's stockpile of weapons-grade material was sufficient for 35 to 37 nuclear weapons.

Institute for Science and International Security 
For 2013, the Institute for Science and International Security gave a mid-range estimate of 12 to 27 "nuclear weapon equivalents", including plutonium and uranium stockpiles. By 2016, North Korea was projected to have 14 to 48 nuclear weapon equivalents. The estimate was dropped to 13 to 30 nuclear weapon equivalents in 2017, but was increased to as much as 60 equivalents later in August of the same year. (For uranium weapons, each weapon is assumed to contain 20 kilograms of weapons-grade uranium.)

FAS 
As of 2012, the Federation of American Scientists estimated North Korea had fewer than 10 plutonium warheads.

In its "Nuclear Notebook" on North Korean nuclear capabilities, published in January 2018, FAS estimated that North Korea had sufficient fissile material for 30 to 60 nuclear weapons. However, the report stated that North Korea had assembled 10 to 20 warheads at most, with most of those warheads likely being single-stage fission weapons with yields of 10 to 20 kilotons.

SIPRI 
As of January 2013, the Stockholm International Peace Research Institute estimated North Korea had 6 to 8 warheads.

In June 2020, the institute's annual report stated that through January 2020 North Korea had added 10 nuclear weapons to the previous year's estimated stockpile of 20 to 30 weapons.

Korea Institute for Defense Analyses 
In 2023, the South Korean government think tank Korea Institute for Defense Analyses published a report estimating that North Korea has between 80 to 90 nuclear warheads with up to 166 warheads by 2030 and a goal to increase to 300.

Chemical and biological weapons 
North Korea began to develop its own chemical industry and chemical weapon (CW) program in 1954, immediately following the end of the Korean War. However, substantial progress was not made until the 1960s, when Kim Il-sung "issued a 'Declaration for Chemicalization' whose aim was to further develop an independent chemical industry capable of supporting various sectors of its economy, as well as support chemical weapons production" and established North Korea's Nuclear and Chemical Defense Bureau.

In the late 1960s and early 1970s, North Korea received Soviet and Chinese aid in developing its chemical industry. In 1979, the U.S. Defense Intelligence Agency believed that North Korea "had only a defensive CW capability." It is unclear when North Korea "acquired the capability for independent CW production"; estimates range from the 1970s to early 1980s. However, by the late 1980s, North Korea's CW capabilities had expanded; the South Korean Ministry of National Defense reported in 1987 that the North "possessed up to 250 metric tons of chemical weapons" including mustard (a blister agent) and some nerve agents. In 2009 the International Crisis Group reported that the consensus expert view was that North Korea had a stockpile of about 2,500 to 5,000 metric tons of chemical weapons, including mustard gas, sarin (GB) and other nerve agents. The South Korean Ministry of National Defense had the same estimate in 2010. In 2014, the South Korean Defense Ministry estimated that "the North had stockpiled 2,500 to 5,000 tons of chemical weapons and had a capacity to produce a variety of biological weapons." In 2015, the U.S. Department of Defense reported to Congress that North Korea's CW program "likely possesses a CW stockpile" and likely had "the capability to produce nerve, blister, blood, and choking agents." The report also found that "North Korea probably could employ CW agents by modifying a variety of conventional munitions, including artillery and ballistic missiles. In addition, North Korean forces are prepared to operate in a contaminated environment; they train regularly in chemical defense operations." The report indicated that North Korea "continues to develop its biological research and development capabilities" and "may consider the use of biological weapons as an option, contrary to its obligations under the Biological and Toxins Weapons Convention."

North Korea is a signatory to the Geneva Protocol, which prohibits the use of chemical weapons in warfare. North Korea is also a signatory to the Biological Weapons Convention (BWC). Although the nation has signed the BWC, it "has failed to provide a BWC Confidence-Building Measure declaration since 1990." North Korea is not a party to the Chemical Weapons Convention (CWC). It is one of four countries that have not ratified the CWC (the others are Israel, Egypt, and South Sudan).

North Korea has refused to acknowledge possessing chemical weapons, as called for by United Nations Security Council Resolution 1718, passed in 2006.

After the 2010 bombardment of Yeonpyeong (in which North Korea attacked Yeonpyeong Island with conventional weapons, killing a number of civilians), the National Emergency Management Agency of South Korea distributed 1,300 gas masks to South Koreans living in the western border (a flashpoint for conflict); the agency also distributed another 610,000 gas masks to members of the South Korean civil defense corps, which numbers 3.93 million.
The agency also announced the renovation of underground emergency shelters. Gas masks are effective against some chemical agents, but not against blister agents such as mustard gas, Lewisite, and Phosgene oxime, which North Korea is thought to have in its stockpiles. In October 2013, South Korea and the United States "agreed to build a joint surveillance system to detect biochemical agents along the demilitarized zone" and to share information.

Also in 2015, Melissa Hanham of the James Martin Center for Nonproliferation Studies released an analysis of a photograph of North Korean supreme leader Kim Jong-un visiting the Pyongyang Bio-technical Institute, a factory supposedly for the production of bacillus thuringiensis of use in pesticides. Hanham's analysis concluded that the factory actually produces weaponized anthrax. Hanham noted that pesticide production factories are "an old and well-used cover for a biological weapons program" and an example of dual-use technology. A number of other experts agreed that "the photos most likely show an operational biological weapons facility." The North Korean government denied the allegations; an official spokesperson for the National Defence Commission, through the official Korean Central News Agency, challenged the U.S. Congress to inspect the Institute and "behold the awe-inspiring sight of the Pyongyang Bio-technical Institute."

North Korea possesses various types of chemical weapons, including nerve, blister, blood, and vomiting agents, as well as some biological weapons, including anthrax, smallpox, and cholera.

In 2017, Kim Jong-nam, the estranged elder half-brother of Kim Jong-un, was assassinated with VX nerve agent at Kuala Lumpur International Airport in Malaysia by suspected North Korean agents.

The identified stockpile is between 2,500 and 5,000 metric tons of chemical weapons. It is one of the world's largest possessors of chemical weapons, ranking third after the United States and Russia.

Delivery systems

History 
In the late 1970s or early 1980s, the DPRK received several longer range Scud-B missiles from Egypt (which in turn received those missiles from the USSR, Bulgaria and Poland). The USSR had refused to supply Scuds directly to North Korea, but North Korea, starting in the 1970s, has produced missiles based on its design: a local production basis was established, and the first modified copy was named Hwasong-5. With time, more advanced types of missiles were developed. Eventually North Korea equipped itself with ballistic missiles, capable of reaching Japan. In the 1990s, North Korea sold medium-sized nuclear capable missiles to Pakistan in a deal facilitated by China.

North Korea's ability to deliver weapons of mass destruction to a hypothetical target is somewhat limited by its missile technology. In 2005, North Korea's total range with its Nodong missiles was estimated as 900 km with a 1,000 kg payload. That is enough to reach South Korea, and parts of Japan, Russia, and China. The Hwasong-10 is a North Korean designed intermediate-range ballistic missile with range capabilities of up to 2,490 km (1,550 mi), and could carry a nuclear warhead.

In an online interview published in 2006, the Japanese Ministry of Defense's analyst Hideshi Takesada argued that North Korea's desire of unification is similar to North Vietnam, and warned of the possibility of North Korea's compulsory merger with South Korea by threats of nuclear weapons, taking advantage of any possible decrease in the U.S. military presence in South Korea, after North Korea deploys several hundred mobile ICBMs aimed at the United States. In 2016, Israeli analyst Uzi Rubin said that the missile program had demonstrated "remarkable achievements".

Report on North Korea by United Nations Panel of Experts with information's disclosed by various member countries that the status of its ballistic missile program as comprehensive and autonomous with guidance system being indigenous, demonstrated by recent test of a short range ballistic missile similar to Iskander and demonstrating depressed trajectory as such.

In January 2020, Vice Chairman of the Joint Chiefs of Staff John E. Hyten said "North Korea is building new missiles, new capabilities, new weapons as fast as anybody on the planet."

On October 18, 2021, North Korea launched a ballistic missile that landed in the Sea of Japan. Japan's prime minister Fumio Kishida called the launch "very regrettable".

The French think tank Foundation for Strategic Research released a report analyzing the North Korean nuclear arsenal and ballistic missiles.  It estimated  the accuracy of short range ballistic missiles such as KN-23 and KN-24 to be 35 meters based on satellite imagery and the distance between impact craters from missile tests, and 80-90 meters for the KN-25 large diameter guided rocket.

The Congressional Research Service issued a report citing a 2017 assessment by the  Defense Intelligence Agency that North Korea has achieved a level of miniatuarization of nuclear warheads needed to mount them on short range and intercontinental ballistic missiles. CRS assessed that the KN-23 SRBM, which can target the entire Korean peninsula, and the KN-15 MRBM, which can target all of Japan, can carry both conventional and nuclear warheads.

Operational delivery systems 

There is evidence that North Korea has been able to miniaturize a nuclear warhead for use on a ballistic missile. According to Japan's defense white paper North Korea does possess the ability to miniaturize nuclear weapons. A defense white paper from South Korea in 2018 said North Korea's ability to miniaturize nuclear weapons has reached a considerable level. In a leaked report the American Defense Intelligence Agency also claims North Korea can miniaturize nuclear warheads for ballistic missiles. Whether North Korea has technology to protect their missiles upon re-entry is unknown. Some analysts suggest North Korea's new missiles are fakes. Various North Korean rocket tests continued into the 2010s, for example in 2013, in 2014, and in 2016. North Korea performed no tests of medium-range missiles sufficiently powerful to reach Japan in 2015, but South Korea's Yonhap news agency believes that at least one missile fired during North Korea's March 2016 missile tests is likely a medium-range Rodong missile. North Korea appeared to launch a missile test from a submarine on April 23, 2016; while the missile only traveled 30 km, one U.S. analyst noted that "North Korea's sub launch capability has gone from a joke to something very serious".

As of 2016, North Korea is known to have approximately 300 Rodong missiles whose maximum range is 1,300 km (800 mi).

Operational or successfully tested 
 Hwasong-5 – initial Scud modification. Road-mobile, liquid-fueled missile, with an estimated range of 330 km. It has been tested successfully. It is believed that North Korea has deployed some 150–200 such missiles on mobile launchers.
 Hwasong-6 – later Scud modification. Similar to the Hwasong-5, yet with an increased range (550–700 km) and a smaller warhead (600–750 kg). Apparently this is the most widely deployed North Korean missile, with at least 400 missiles in use.
 Hwasong-7 – larger and more advanced Scud modification. Liquid-fueled, road-mobile missile with a 650 kg warhead. First production variants had inertial guidance, later variants featured GPS guidance, which improves CEP accuracy to 190–250 m. Range is estimated to be between 1,300 and 1,600 km.
 Hwasong-9 is also known as Scud-ER in rest of the world is further development of Hwasong-6 with range of (1000–1000+ km) and is capable of hitting Japan.
 Hwasong-10 – believed to be a modified copy of the Soviet R-27 Zyb SLBM. Originally believed to have been tested as the first or second stage of Unha, but debris analysis showed that the Unha used older technology than it is believed the Hwasong-10 uses. Also known under the names Nodong-B, Taepodong-X, Musudan and BM25, predicted to have a range of 2,500–4,000 km. A DoD report puts BM25 strength at fewer than 50 launchers.
 Hwasong-11 – a short-range, solid-fueled, highly accurate mobile missile, modified copy of the Soviet OTR-21. Unknown number in service, apparently deployed either in the late 1990s or early 2000s (decade).
 Pukguksong-1 – a long-range, solid-fueled, SLBM. Also called the KN-11 by the Defense Department. Possibly derived from the Chinese JL-1 SLBM.
 Pukguksong-2 – a long-range, land based development of the solid fueled Pukguksong-1. Also known as the KN-15.
 Hwasong-12 – a medium-range, liquid-fueled, mobile missile. First tested in May 2017. also known as KN-17 outside of Korea, South Korean experts estimate range of 5000 to 6000 km based on successful test conducted in May.
 Hwasong-14 – Also known as the KN-20, a long-range, road transportable ICBM, tested on July 4 and 29, 2017, estimated range is  John Schilling estimates the current accuracy of the North's Hwasong-14 as poor at the mooted ranges which threaten US cities (which would require more testing to prove its accuracy). Michael Elleman has pointed out that the NHK video which captured the descent of the reentry vehicle (RV) shows its failure to survive reentry. If the RV had survived reentry, the video would have shown a bright image all the way to impact in the sea. However a recent CIA assessment notes that North Korea's ICBM reentry vehicles would likely perform adequately if flown on a normal trajectory to continental U.S. targets.
 Hwasong-15 – 13,000 km range, successfully tested on November 28, 2017.
 KN-23 - 700 km range, Successfully tested on May 4, 2019. Similar to 9K720 Iskander. Demonstrated range of 800 kilometers on September 15, 2021.
 Hwasong-17 – potential range over 15,000 km depending on the warhead weight, according to initial Japanese estimate. The ICBM was believed to be first successfully tested on a full flight on November 18, 2022. The ICBM's long-range accuracy, and its ability to survive re-entry, are unknown as of 2022.

Untested 
 KN-08 – Road-mobile ICBM. Also called the Hwasong-13 (HS-13). Maximum range >5,500 km (3,400 miles). The US Defense Department estimates at least 6 KN-08 launchers are in deployment. A modified version, the KN-14, was unveiled at a parade marking the 70th anniversary of the Workers' Party of Korea. The missile development was halted due to engine problems.

Exports related to ballistic missile technology 
In April 2009, the United Nations named the Korea Mining and Development Trading Corporation (KOMID) as North Korea's primary arms dealer and main exporter of equipment related to ballistic missiles and conventional weapons. The UN lists KOMID as being based in the Central District, Pyongyang. However, it also has offices in Beijing and sales offices worldwide which facilitate weapons sales and seek new customers for North Korean weapons.

KOMID has sold missile technology to Iran and has done deals for missile related technology with the Taiwanese. KOMID has also been responsible for the sale of equipment, including missile technologies, gunboats, and multiple rocket artilleries, worth a total of over $100 million, to Africa, South America, and the Middle East.

North Korea's military has also used a company called Hap Heng to sell weapons overseas. Hap Heng was based in Macau in the 1990s to handle sales of weapons and missile and nuclear technology to nations such as Pakistan and Iran. Pakistan's medium-range ballistic missile, the Ghauri, is considered to be a copy of North Korea's Rodong 1. In 1999, intelligence sources claim that North Korea had sold missile components to Iran. Listed directors of Hap Heng include Kim Song in and Ko Myong Hun. Ko Myong Hun is now a listed diplomat in Beijing and may be involved in the work of KOMID.

A UN Security Council sanctions committee report stated that North Korea operates an international smuggling network for nuclear and ballistic missile technology, including to Myanmar (Burma), Syria, and Iran.

Export partners 
Several countries have bought North Korean ballistic missiles or have received assistance from North Korea to establish local missile production.

Egypt has received technologies and assistance for manufacture of both the Hwasong-5 and Hwasong-6, and may have provided guidance systems or information on longer-range missiles to North Korea from the Condor/Badr program.
Iran was one of the first countries to buy North Korean missiles. Iran has established local production for the Hwasong-5 (Shahab-1), Hwasong-6 (Shahab-2) and the Rodong-1 (Shahab-3). Iran also possesses 19 land-based BM25 Musudan missiles, according to a leaked, classified U.S. State Department cable, Iran designated the Musudan as Khorramshahr. This nuclear-capable missile is currently under development and failed its two known flight tests.
North Korean entities continued to provide assistance to Pakistan's ballistic missile program during the first half of 1999 in return for nuclear weapons technology. Such assistance was critical to Islamabad's efforts to produce ballistic missiles. In April 1998, Pakistan flight-tested the Ghauri MRBM, which is based on North Korea's Nodong missile. Also in April 1998, the United States imposed sanctions against Pakistani and North Korean entities for their role in transferring Missile Technology Control Regime Category I ballistic missile-related technology.

Syria originally obtained the Scud-B from North Korea. North Korea may have assisted Syria in development of the Scud-C and/or the Scud-D. As of 2013, Syria relies on foreign assistance from multiple countries, including North Korea, for advanced missile components and technologies. In 2018, a United Nations report alleged that North Korea had been sending technicians and material to Syria to assist in its chemical weapons program, including acid-resistant tiles, valves, and thermometers.

25 Hwasong-5s were purchased from North Korea in 1989. The UAE Union Defence Force were not satisfied with the quality of the missiles, and they were kept in storage.

Vietnam reportedly ordered Hwasong-5/6 missiles in 1998–99, but it is unclear if this deal was fulfilled.

Yemen is known to have bought Scud missiles from North Korea in the 1990s—a total of 15 missiles, conventional warheads and fuel oxidizer.

Former export partners 

Libya during the rule of Muammar Gaddafi had been known to receive technological assistance, blueprints and missile parts from North Korea.

Rejection by a potential export partner 
In January 2004, the Nigerian government announced that North Korea had agreed to sell its missile technology, but a month later Nigeria rejected the agreement under U.S. pressure.

International responses

In the 1990s, the United States negotiated the Agreed Framework to freeze North Korea's nuclear weapons program while pursuing the denuclearization of the Korean peninsula. This broke down when North Korea's clandestine uranium enrichment program came to light in 2002, after which China convened the six-party talks to negotiate a step-by-step process to denuclearization. The six-party talks stalled after multiple North Korean nuclear and missile tests, leading to increased international Sanctions against North Korea, including a series of sanctions resolutions imposed by the United Nations Security Council. In 2018, Presidents Moon Jae-in of South Korea and Donald Trump of the United States held a series of summits with Kim Jong-un which led to declarations in favor of the denuclearization of the Korean peninsula.

International inspections
On October 31, 2018, lawmaker Kim Min-ki of South Korea's ruling Democratic Party of Korea issued a statement revealing that officials from South Korea's National Intelligence Service had observed several of North Korea's nuclear and missile test sites and that they were now ready for the upcoming international inspections. Kim also stated that the now inactive North Korean Punggye-ri Nuclear Test Site and the Sohae Satellite launching ground were included in these observations. The visit by the intelligence officials was in tandem with the September 2018 Pyongyang Agreement, which saw North Korean leader Kim Jung-Un agree to close Sohae and allow international experts to observe the dismantling of the missile engine testing site and a launch pad. The international experts will also be allowed to witness the dismantling of other North Korean nuclear and missile test sites as well. Yongbyon, the main nuclear facility in North Korea, has also been inactive during the past year as well, but has not yet completely closed.

See also 

 Korean conflict
 Korean reunification
 2017–18 North Korea crisis
 2002 State of the Union Address
 Foreign relations of North Korea
 List of nuclear weapons tests of North Korea
 North Korea–Pakistan relations
 North Korea–United States relations
 Nuclear power in North Korea
 Sohae Satellite Launching Station
 
South Korea and weapons of mass destruction

Notes

References

External links 

 Federation of American Scientists guide to North Korean chemical weapons
 Jonathan D. Pollack, "North Korea's Nuclear Weapon Development: Implications for Future Policy" Proliferation Papers, Paris, IFRI, Spring 2010
 North Korea's missile arsenal– Key facts (based on South Korean defense ministry data); AFP, June 1, 2005
 North Korea: Problems, Perceptions and Proposals– Oxford Research Group, April 2004
 Second nuclear test conducted by North Korea on May 25, 2009
 Nuclear Files.org Information on the North Korean nuclear program including links to source documents
 Annotated bibliography for the North Korean nuclear weapons program from the Alsos Digital Library
 The February 13 Action Plan and the Prospects for the North Korean Nuclear Issue – analysis by Narushige Michishita, IFRI Proliferation Papers n° 17, 2007
 North Korean International Documentation Project Contains primary source documents related to the DPRK's efforts to obtain nuclear technology dating back to the mid-1960s
 TIME Archives A Collection of stories regarding North Korea's Nuclear Program
 Chung Min Lee, "The Evolution of the North Korean Nuclear Crisis: Implications for Iran", Proliferation Papers, Paris, IFRI, Winter 2009
 Norris, Robert S. and Kristensen, Hans M., "North Korea's nuclear program, 2005", Bulletin of the Atomic Scientists, May/June 2005
 Normalizing Japan: Supporter, Nuisance, or Wielder of Power in the North Korean Nuclear Talks – An analysis of Japan's role in the Six-Party Talks by Linus Hagström.
 North Korea: Economic Sanctions
 Chronology of U.S. – North Korean Nuclear and Missile Diplomacy
 North Korea's Nuclear Weapons Development and Diplomacy Congressional Research Service.
 IISS North Korea's Ballistic Missile Programme
 List of all sanctions against North Korea 
 Nuclear North Korea – Reuters (Updated September 3, 2017)

 
Military history of North Korea
Anti-North Korean sentiment in South Korea
Foreign relations of North Korea
Weapons of mass destruction by country